The RAC Tourist Trophy (sometimes called the International Tourist Trophy) is a motor racing award presented by the Royal Automobile Club (RAC) to the overall victor of a motor race in the United Kingdom. Established in 1905, it is the world's oldest continuous motor race. The 18-carat gold trophy is based on Giambologna's sculpture of the Greek god Hermes. Series to have featured the trophy include the World Sportscar Championship, the FIA GT Cup, the World Touring Car Championship, the European Touring Car Championship, the FIA GT Championship, the British Touring Car Championship, the FIA GT1 World Championship, and the overall winners of the British GT Championship in the 1999, 2000, 2003 and 2004 seasons. It has been presented to the overall winners of the Silverstone Circuit round of the FIA World Endurance Championship from 2013 on.

The race was first contested on the Isle of Man in 1905 and continued to be held on the island until 1922. It moved to the Ards Circuit on Northern Ireland's public roads in 1928 after an article written by the journalist Wallace McLeod in a Belfast newspaper suggested it occur in the area and the inventor Harry Ferguson helped the RAC to find a suitable track. Donington Park staged the trophy's following two races in 1937 and 1938 after a major accident involving a Riley car during the 1936 edition killed eight onlookers and injured another 25. Following the Second World War, it returned to Northern Ireland and was held on the shorter Dundrod Circuit; a second major crash that killed three competitors in 1955 led the local authorities to bar all future car races on the track. Since then, the race has occurred on permanent racing circuits rather than closed public road tracks.

John Napier in an Arrol-Johnston was the event's inaugural winner in 1905. The first non-British driver to win the race was the Frenchman Jean Chassagne, who drove a Sunbeam Tourist Trophy car to victory in the 1922 race. Italian driver Tazio Nuvolari became the first driver in history to claim the trophy in 1933 to accompany it with an overall victory in the 24 Hours of Le Mans in the same year. The winners has been decided by the disqualification of drivers on three occasions, in 2010 to the Nissan pair of Jamie Campbell-Walter and Warren Hughes after the Aston Martin Young Driver AMR pair of Darren Turner and Tomáš Enge lost the victory due to excess wear on their car's plank, in 2016 when Audi's Marcel Fässler, André Lotterer and Benoît Tréluyer were disqualified for a skid block infringement and promoted Porsche's Romain Dumas, Neel Jani and Marc Lieb to first, and in 2018 after two Toyota TS050 Hybrids were disqualified for a failed post-race test and elevated Rebellion Racing drivers Mathias Beche, Thomas Laurent and Gustavo Menezes to the victory. The current winners are Mike Conway, Kamui Kobayashi and José María López for Toyota.

Winners

Statistics

Notes

References

External links

 

 
Auto racing trophies and awards
Auto races in the United Kingdom
Tourist Trophy
Touring car races
Recurring sporting events established in 1905
1905 establishments in the United Kingdom